Dan Goggin may refer to:
 Dan Goggin (composer)
 Dan Goggin (rugby union)